Jaśkowice may refer to the following places:
Jaśkowice, Lesser Poland Voivodeship (south Poland)
Jaśkowice, Kluczbork County in Opole Voivodeship (south-west Poland)
Jaśkowice, Silesian Voivodeship (south Poland)
Jaśkowice, Opole County in Opole Voivodeship (south-west Poland)